Zach Parker (born 2 June 1994) is a British professional boxer who held the British super-middleweight title from 2018 to 2019.

Professional career 

Parker made his professional debut on 11 July 2015 against Lewis van Poetsch at the Chase Leisure Centre in Cannock, Staffordshire, winning via fourth-round technical knockout (TKO).

After winning his first 16 fights, 11 by stoppage, he faced Darryll Williams on 3 November 2018 for the vacant British super-middleweight title at The SSE Hydro in Glasgow, Scotland, on the undercard of the World Boxing Super Series super lightweight quarter-final fight between Josh Taylor and Ryan Martin. Parker won the fight via split decision with two judges scoring the bout 117–112 and 115–114 in favour of Parker and the third scoring it 115–113 to Williams. After suffering a dislocated left shoulder and torn rotator cuff in the second round, Parker boxed from the southpaw stance, one handed, behind the right jab to secure a highly controversial split decision win which many believed should have been given to Williams.

Professional boxing record

Notes

References

External links

Living people
1994 births
People from Swadlincote
Sportspeople from Derbyshire
English male boxers
Super-middleweight boxers
British Boxing Board of Control champions